Kükəl (also, Kyukel’) is a village and municipality in the Agdash Rayon of Azerbaijan.  It has a population of 1,183.

References 

Populated places in Agdash District